If 3 is the third release by the English jazz rock band If. It was released in August 1971 by United Artists Records (U.K.) and Capitol Records (U.S.) and reached #171 on the Billboard Pop Albums Chart. It was reissued in CD in 2006 by Bodyheat with 2 bonus tracks, then by Repertoire in 2007 with 2 different bonus tracks.

The track "Forgotten Roads" featured on the band's live appearance on German TV's Beat-Club in September 1971.

The track "Here Comes Mr. Time" was included on the United Artists Records promotional sampler All Good Clean Fun (1971).

Track listing

Side one
 "Fibonacci's Number" (Quincy) – 7:38
 "Forgotten Roads" (Quincy, Preston) – 4:23
 "Sweet January" (Quincy, Preston) – 4:30
 "Child of Storm" (Quincy, Hodkinson) – 3:39

Side two
 "Far Beyond" (Mealing, Preston) – 4:57
 "Seldom Seen Sam" (Smith, Hodkinson) – 4:50
 "Upstairs" (B. Morrissey, D. Morrissey) – 4:52
 "Here Comes Mr. Time" (Mealing, Preston) – 4:43

Bonus tracks on 2006 CD release
 "What Did I Say About the Box Jack?" (studio version) (D. Morrissey) – 8:24
 "What Did I Say About the Box Jack?" (live version) (D. Morrissey) – 20:23

(live version recorded during a European Tour in 1972 and reissued also in "If Europe '72" (Repertoire, 1997)

Bonus tracks on 2007 CD release
 "Forgotten Roads" (single version) (Preston, Quincy) – 4:03
 "Far Beyond" (single version) (Mealing, Preston) – 3:53

("Forgotten Roads" reissued also in "More Live If" (Repertoire, 2010)

Personnel
 J.W. Hodkinson – lead vocals, percussion
 Dick Morrissey – tenor and soprano saxophones, backing vocals, flute
 Dave Quincy – tenor and alto saxophones, flute
 Terry Smith – guitar
 John Mealing – organ, backing vocals, electric piano
 Jim Richardson – bass
 Dennis Elliott – drums

References

External links
 

1971 albums
If (band) albums
United Artists Records albums
Albums produced by Dennis Elliott
Albums produced by John Mealing
Albums produced by Dick Morrissey
Albums produced by Jim Richardson
Albums produced by Terry Smith (guitarist)